This is a list of palaces commissioned by the Ottoman dynasty in İstanbul, Turkey. Some of these buildings are summer houses or mansions.

See also 
Ottoman architecture
List of palaces
Palace
Pavilion

Footnotes

Notes

 
Imperial residences in Turkey
Lists of buildings and structures in Turkey
Palaces